Trypherus is a genus of soldier beetles in the family Cantharidae. There are at least 4 described species in Trypherus.

Species
 Trypherus blaisdelli Fender, 1960
 Trypherus frisoni Fender, 1960
 Trypherus latipennis (Germar, 1824)
 Trypherus pauperculus Fender, 1960

References

 Delkeskamp, Kurt (1977). "Cantharidae". Coleopterorum Catalogus Supplementa, pars 165, fasc. 1, 485.

Further reading

 Arnett, R.H. Jr., M. C. Thomas, P. E. Skelley and J. H. Frank. (eds.). (2002). American Beetles, Volume II: Polyphaga: Scarabaeoidea through Curculionoidea. CRC Press LLC, Boca Raton, FL.
 
 Richard E. White. (1983). Peterson Field Guides: Beetles. Houghton Mifflin Company.

External links

 NCBI Taxonomy Browser, Trypherus

Cantharidae